The first rugby union match between England and France was held on 22 March 1906 at Parc des Princes in Paris.

The traditional name for the annual England versus France rugby union match in the Six Nations Championship as used on both sides of the English Channel is Le Crunch, used since at least 1981(although it has been named 'Eurostar Trophy' a few times in France, since 2000). Apart from their annual match, currently part of the Six Nations Championship, the teams have also met in six warm-up matches prior to the 2003, 2007 and 2015 World Cups, with France winning on four occasions and England two. They have also met on five occasions at the Rugby World Cup with England winning on three occasions and France two. England and France have played each other on 110 occasions, England winning 60, France winning 43, and 7 matches have been drawn. Overall, England have scored 1,757 points, and France 1,457.

Summary

Overall

Records 
Note: Date shown in brackets indicates when the record was last set.

Results

Non-test results
Below is a list of matches that were not awarded test match status and so do not appear in the list of official statistics

Notes

References

England national rugby union team matches
France national rugby union team matches
Rugby union rivalries in England
Rugby union rivalries in France
Six Nations Championship